Lindsay Forde (born 27 July 1954) is a New Zealand cricketer. He played in four first-class and three List A matches for Canterbury from 1975 to 1977.

See also
 List of Canterbury representative cricketers

References

External links
 

1954 births
Living people
New Zealand cricketers
Canterbury cricketers
Cricketers from Dunedin